USSB might stand for: 

United States Satellite Broadcasting
United States Shipping Board
Upper Single-sideband (modulation)